DYAF (1143 AM) Radyo Totoo is a radio station owned and operated by the Roman Catholic Diocese of Bacolod, a member of the Catholic Media Network. Its studio and transmitter are located along San Juan St., cor. Antonio Y. Fortich Ave., Bacolod.

References

Catholic radio stations
Radio stations established in 1992
Radio stations in Bacolod